Follow Thru is a musical comedy with book by B. G. DeSylva and Laurence Schwab, lyrics by B. G. DeSylva and Lew Brown, and music by Ray Henderson.
 
Produced by Laurence Schwab and Frank Mandel, the Broadway production opened on January 9, 1929 at the Chanin's 46th St. Theatre and ran through December 21, 1929 for a total run of 401 performances. The show was directed by Edgar MacGregor, choreographed by Bobby Connolly, and used set designs by Donald Oenslager. The cast included Jack Haley, Zelma O’Neal, John Barker and Eleanor Powell.

Called “a musical slice of country club life”, the plot involved a golf match at a country club. This was the first Broadway success for Eleanor Powell. The show produced several songs that are now standards, including “Button Up Your Overcoat”, “My Lucky Star”, and “I Want to be Bad”.

Musical Numbers
Act I
Scene I: The Bound Brook Country Club, 1908
 Opening: The Daring Gibson Girl/The 1908 Life - Ensemble
 Old Fashioned Dance - Cynthia and Ensemble
Scene II: On the Golf Links, 1928
 It's a Great Sport - Babs, Ruth, Lora and Ensemble
Scene III: At the Sun Porch
 My Lucky Star - Jerry and Girls
 Button Up Your Overcoat - Angie and Jack
 You Wouldn't Fool Me, Would Ya? - Lora and Jerry
Scene IV: Where the Bushes Are Thickest
Scene V: In Front of the Clubhouse
 He's a Man's Man - Ruth and Ensemble
 Then I'll have Time for you - Babs and Dinty
 I Want To Be Bad - Angie
 Finaletto - Lora and Jerry
Act II
Scene I: In Front of the Clubhouse
 We Couldn't Miss this Match - Chorus
 If There Were No More You - Lora and Jerry
 I Could Give Up Anything But You - Jack and Angy
 Follow Thru - Ruth and Ensemble
Scene II: Near the Clubhouse

Scene III: The Ladies’s Locker Room

Scene IV: On the Fourteenth Hole

Scene V: On the Eighteenth Hole

Scene VI: Where the Bushes are Thickest
 I Could Give Up Anything But You - Angy and Jack
Scene VII: The Gate
 Finale: You Wouldn't Fool Would Me, Would Ya? - Entire Company

External links
 

1929 musicals
Broadway musicals
Musicals set in the Roaring Twenties